Chaplyginsky District is an administrative and municipal district (raion), one of the eighteen in Lipetsk Oblast, Russia. It is located in the northeast of the oblast. Its administrative center is the town of Chaplygin. Population:  36,069 (2002 Census);  The population of Chaplygin accounts for 38.7% of the district's total population.

References

Notes

Sources

Districts of Lipetsk Oblast